Idra Group (Idra S.r.l.; originally Idra Presse S.p.A.) is a manufacturer of die casting machinery, founded in 1946 in Brescia, Italy.  The company is notable for producing the largest high-pressure die casting machines in the world.

History 
The company was originally founded by Adamo Pasotti in 1944 or 1946 with the factory located on via Triumplina in Brescia.

By 1956, Idra was seeking to export its die-casting machines outside Italy.

By 1971, an Idra  machine was being used to cast motor components weighing  for Porsche cars.

Hot years 
During Italy's Years of Lead in the 1970s, Giovanni Maifredi worked at Idra as a warehouse worker, having been provided with a job without having any qualifications.
Following the Piazza della Loggia bombing in Brescia on 28 May 1974, Idra factory workers organised a fifteen-day strike action and picket line outside the Idra factory.

Original site 
The original factory site at via Triumplina 43 in the north of Brescia was developed into the Triumplina Retail Park, requiring construction of new roundabout junctions.

Ownership 

By 2016,  had acquired the remainder of the outstanding shares.

Development 

In 2000, Idra filed a patent application for die casting machine designed to produce two separate castings simultaneously from a single injection of liquid metal.

References

Further reading

External links 

Companies based in Brescia
Manufacturing companies established in 1944
Manufacturing companies established in 1946
Idra Group